The Valea lui Damian is a right tributary of the river Câlniștea in Romania. It flows into the Câlniștea in Răsuceni.

References

Rivers of Romania
Rivers of Giurgiu County